Flight 304 may refer to:
BCPA Flight 304, crashed on 29 October 1953
Trans-Canada Air Lines Flight 304, propeller loss on 9 July 1956
Eastern Air Lines Flight 304, crashed on 25 February 1964
Aeronor Flight 304, crashed on 9 December 1982
Sempati Air Flight 304, crashed on 17 July 1997

0304